is a Japanese former swimmer. He competed in the men's 400 metre freestyle at the 1956 Summer Olympics.

References

External links
 

1936 births
Living people
Japanese male freestyle swimmers
Olympic swimmers of Japan
Swimmers at the 1956 Summer Olympics
Place of birth missing (living people)
20th-century Japanese people